Taggart is an unincorporated community in Hamblen Township, Brown County, in the U.S. state of Indiana.

History
The community was named after the local Taggart family, who were among the first settlers of Hamblen Township.

Geography

References

Unincorporated communities in Brown County, Indiana
Unincorporated communities in Indiana